Prochoreutis dyarella is a moth of the family Choreutidae. It is known from North America, including California.

References

Prochoreutis
Moths of North America
Moths described in 1902